Angelos Georgiou (born 27 August 1974) is a Greek retired professional goalkeeper.

Honours

Club
Olympiacos
Greek Championship: 2001–02

References

Paniliakos F.C. players
Olympiacos F.C. players
1974 births
Greek footballers
Greek expatriate footballers
Footballers from Larissa
Living people
Association football goalkeepers